Kinwa Ukru (Quechua kinwa Chenopodium quinoa, ukru hole, pit, hollow, "quinoa hole", Hispanicized spelling Quenhuaucro) is a  mountain in the Andes of Peru. It is located in the Lima Region, Oyón Province, Oyón District. Kinwa Ukru lies west of a mountain named Aququcha.

References

Mountains of Peru
Mountains of Lima Region